Rima Sypkus (formerly Sipkuviene; born 5 January 1967) is a retired Lithuanian-born Austrian female handball player who played for the Austria national team. She competed in the women's tournament at the 2000 Summer Olympics.

International honours 
EHF Champions League:
Gold Medalist: 1994, 1995, 1998, 2000

European Championship:
Bronze Medalist: 1996

World Championship:
Bronze Medalist: 1999

References
 

    
1967 births
Living people
Sportspeople from Vilnius
Lithuanian female handball players 
Austrian female handball players 
Naturalised citizens of Austria
Austrian people of Lithuanian descent
Olympic handball players of Austria
Handball players at the 2000 Summer Olympics